In enzymology, a mannose-1-phosphate guanylyltransferase (GDP) is an enzyme that catalyzes the chemical reaction

GDP + alpha-D-mannose 1-phosphate  phosphate + GDP-mannose

Thus, the two substrates of this enzyme are GDP and alpha-D-mannose 1-phosphate, whereas its two products are phosphate and GDP-mannose.

This enzyme belongs to the family of transferases, specifically those transferring phosphorus-containing nucleotide groups (nucleotidyltransferases).  The systematic name of this enzyme class is GDP:alpha-D-mannose-1-phosphate guanylyltransferase. This enzyme participates in fructose and mannose metabolism.

Other common names
GDP mannose phosphorylase
Mannose 1-phosphate (guanosine diphosphate) guanylyltransferase
GDP mannose phosphorylase
GDP-mannose 1-phosphate guanylyltransferase
Guanosine diphosphate-mannose 1-phosphate guanylyltransferase
Guanosine diphosphomannose phosphorylase
Mannose 1-phosphate guanylyltransferase
GDP:D-mannose-1-phosphate guanylyltransferase

References

 

EC 2.7.7
Enzymes of unknown structure